The Massachusetts Executive Office of Health and Human Services (EOHHS) is a Cabinet level agency under the Governor of Massachusetts. EOHHS is the largest secretariat in Massachusetts, and is responsible for the Medicaid program, child welfare, public health, disabilities, veterans’ affairs, and elder affairs.  In total, EOHHS oversees 17 state agencies.

The agency is under the supervision and control of the  Secretary of Health and Human Services, who is appointed by the Governor.

Leadership
The current Secretary of Health and Human Services is Marylou Sudders, who was appointed by Governor Charlie Baker in 2015.

Agencies
Department of Children & Families
Department of Developmental Services
Department of Elder Affairs
Department of Mental Health
Department of Public Health
Department of Transitional Assistance
Department of Veterans' Services
Department of Youth Services
Massachusetts Commission for the Blind
Massachusetts Commission for the Deaf & Hard of Hearing
Massachusetts Rehabilitation Commission
MassHealth
Office of Diversity, Equal Opportunity and Civil Rights
Office of Human Resources
Office for Refugees & Immigrants
Soldiers' Home in Chelsea
Soldiers' Home in Holyoke

References

External links
 Executive Office of Health and Human Services
 . (Various documents).
 Cabinet fillings

Executive Office of Health and Human Services
Massachusetts Executive Office of Health and Human Services